Stigmella fasciata is a moth of the family Nepticulidae. It is found in Slovenia, Croatia, Greece and Turkey.

The wingspan is 4.3–5 mm. Adults are on wing from June to September.

The larvae feed on Quercus pubescens. They mine the leaves of their host plant. The mine consists of an extremely densely wound corridor, resembling a brown dot. Only the last part of the corridor loosens itself from the knot.

External links
Fauna Europaea
bladmineerders.nl
The Quercus Feeding Stigmella Species Of The West Palaearctic: New Species, Key And Distribution (Lepidoptera: Nepticulidae)

Nepticulidae
Moths of Europe
Moths of Asia
Moths described in 2003